The sub-provincial municipality of Shenzhen in Guangdong, China is divided into nine districts and one management new area. Shenzhen is further divided into 74 subdistricts since the latest plan in October 2016.

County-level divisions

Subdistricts

(Source unless otherwise stated:)

Historical divisions

ROC (1911-1949)

References

 
Shenzhen
Shenzhen-related lists